This list of Ports and harbours in Bulgaria details the ports, harbours around the coast of Bulgaria.

List of ports and harbours in Bulgaria

External links

References

Ports

Bulgaria